Vadiyakkadu is a village in the Madukkur Panchayat Union, Pattukkottai taluk of Thanjavur district, Tamil Nadu, India, also known as Vadiyakkadu. It is a small and well developing Village located in southern part of Tamil Nadu. It is 15 km from Pattukkottai. It is surrounded with number of villages. Being in the Cauvery River Delta Area the inhabitants’ main occupation is agriculture. Tamil is the official language and is predominantly spoken.

Demographics 
As per the 2001 census, Vadiyakkadu had a total population of 1147 with 580 males and 567 females. The sex ratio was 978. The literacy rate was 71.1.

Major cultivation
Thanjavur is known as the "Rice bowl of Tamil Nadu". Paddy is the crops and the other crops grown are blackgram, banana, coconut, gingelly, ragi, red gram, green gram, sugarcane and maize. The total percentage of land fit for cultivation is 58%. There are three seasons for agriculture in Thanjavur - Kuruvai (June to September), Samba (August to January) and Thaladi (September, October to February, March) but due to lack of water resources maximum area should be planted by coconut trees. Paddy and coconut are the major crops cultivated by Vadiyakkadu people.

Education
There is One Government Primary School located in south street.

Temples

There are five major temples – Vinayagar Temple, Marriyamman Temple, Sivan Kovil, and Ayyanar Temple.

Others
Political:

Member of Legislative Assembly N.R. Rangarajan (IN Congress)- MLA of Pattukottai.
Councillor - M. Sekar (AIADMK, Keelakurichi)

Vadiyakkadu is a part of the Thanjavur Lok Sabha constituency
Most of the peoples are supporters of AIADMK, DMK and INC Congress.

References 
 

Villages in Thanjavur district